"What a Wonderful World" is a song written by Bob Thiele (as "George Douglas") and George David Weiss. It was first recorded by Louis Armstrong and released in 1967 as a single. In April 1968, it topped the pop chart in the United Kingdom, but performed poorly in the United States because Larry Newton, the president of ABC Records, disliked the song and refused to promote it.

After it was heard in the film Good Morning, Vietnam, it was reissued as a single in 1988, and rose to number 32 on the Billboard Hot 100. Armstrong's recording was inducted to the Grammy Hall of Fame in 1999.

Composition and production 
Thiele produced the track under his own name, but as a co-composer was initially credited under the pseudonym George Douglas. His real name has appeared on it from its 1988 issue onward.

One source claims the song was first offered to Tony Bennett, who turned it down, although Louis Armstrong biographer Ricky Riccardi disputes this. In Graham Nash's book Off the Record: Songwriters on Songwriting, George Weiss says he wrote the song specifically for Louis Armstrong, as he was inspired by Armstrong's ability to bring together people of different races.

Armstrong was gigging at the Tropicana Hotel in Las Vegas, so he chose to record the song nearby at Bill Porter’s United Recording studio. The session was scheduled to follow Armstrong's midnight show, and by 2 am the musicians were settled and tape was rolling. Arranger Artie Butler was there with songwriters Weiss and Thiele, and Armstrong was in the studio singing with the orchestra. Armstrong had recently signed to ABC Records, and ABC president Larry Newton showed up to photograph Armstrong. Newton wanted a swingy pop song like "Hello, Dolly!", a big hit for Armstrong when he was with Kapp Records, so when Newton heard the slow pace of "What a Wonderful World", he tried to stop the session. Newton was physically removed and locked out of the studio for his disruption, which resulted in Newton later refusing to promote the song.

A second problem arose with the taping session: Nearby freight train whistles interrupted the music twice, forcing the orchestra to start over. Armstrong shook his head and laughed off the distractions, keeping his composure. The session ended around 6 am, going longer than expected. To be sure the orchestra members were paid extra for their overtime, Armstrong accepted only $250 musicians' union scale for his work.

Release and reception

Because Newton refused to promote the song, it initially sold fewer than 1,000 copies in the US. It was a major success in the United Kingdom, however, reaching number 1 on the UK Singles Chart. In the US, it eventually reached number 116 on the Billboard Bubbling Under Chart. It was also the biggest-selling single of 1968 in the UK, where it was among the last pop singles issued by HMV before it became an exclusively classical music label. The song made Armstrong the oldest male to top the UK Singles Chart. (His record was broken in 2009 when a remake of "Islands in the Stream" recorded for Comic Relief—which included the 68-year-old Tom Jones—reached number 1.)

ABC Records' European distributor EMI forced ABC to issue a What a Wonderful World album in 1968 (catalogue number ABCS-650). It did not chart in the United States, due to ABC not promoting it, but charted in the UK where it was issued by Stateside Records with catalogue number SSL 10247 and peaked on the British chart at number 37.

Enduring success

The song gradually became something of a standard and reached a new level of popularity. An episode of The Muppet Show produced in 1977 and broadcast early in 1978 featured Rowlf the Dog singing the song to a puppy. In 1978, it was featured in the closing scenes of BBC radio's The Hitchhiker's Guide to the Galaxy, and was repeated for BBC's 1981 TV adaptation of the series. In 1988, Armstrong's recording was used in the film Good Morning, Vietnam (despite its setting in 1965, two years before the song was recorded) and was re-released as a single, reaching number 32 on the Billboard Hot 100 chart in February 1988. It charted at number 1 for the fortnight ending June 27, 1988 on the Australian chart. It is also the closing song for the 1995 movie 12 Monkeys and the 1998 film adaptation of Madeline.

When the ABC television sitcom Family Matters premiered in 1989, Armstrong's version of "What a Wonderful World" was used as the show's theme song. However, after the fifth episode, it was replaced by the original song "As Days Go By".

In 2001, rappers Ghostface Killah, Raekwon, and the Alchemist released "The Forest," a song that begins with three lines of lyric adapted from "What a Wonderful World", altered to become "an invitation to get high" on marijuana. The rappers and their record company, Sony Music Entertainment, were sued by Abilene Music, the owners of "What a Wonderful World". The suit was thrown out after Judge Gerard E. Lynch determined that the altered lyric was a parody, transforming the uplifting original message to a new one with a darker nature.

After it was released digitally, Armstrong's 1967 recording had sold over 2,173,000 downloads in the United States as of April, 2004.

In 2021, it was ranked at No. 171 on Rolling Stone's "Top 500 Best Songs of All Time".

Charts and certifications

Weekly charts

Year-end charts

Certifications

Eva Cassidy and Katie Melua version

In 2007, Georgian-British singer-songwriter Katie Melua recorded a version of "What a Wonderful World" with American singer and guitarist Eva Cassidy, who had died in 1996. Recorded by Melua singing over the original Cassidy track, the duet was released in late 2007 as a charity single for the British Red Cross. Melua, who considers Cassidy one of her musical idols, had previously sung with Cassidy in this manner on Christmas Eve 2006, when she performed "Over the Rainbow" on the BBC One television program Duets Impossible with a videotape of Cassidy singing the song. This version of "What a Wonderful World" was available for purchase only at Tesco stores and on the Tesco Direct website.

Upon its release, the single debuted at number 45 on the Scottish Singles Chart on the week of December 9, 2007. The next week, the song rose 44 positions to number one while also debuting at number one on the UK Singles Chart, giving both Cassidy and Melua their first number-one single in the United Kingdom. It also became the first UK number-one single available through only one retailer, with 97 percent of its weekly 56,114 sales coming from the physical CD format sold at Tesco. The song quickly dropped off the UK chart after peaking, spending only five weeks in the UK top 100. In Scotland, the song stayed in the top 100 for 11 weeks. The cover was also successful in Sweden, reaching number 19 in November 2008, and it became a minor hit in the Wallonia region of Belgium.

When the song reached number one in the UK, Melua thanked everyone who bought the single, saying, "Thank you to everyone who has shown such festive goodwill." The duet was later included on her 2008 compilation album The Katie Melua Collection.

Charts

Weekly charts

Year-end charts

Other notable versions
 1988: Willie Nelson, on his album What a Wonderful World  (reached number 6 on the Billboard Top Country Albums)
 1989: Roy Clark, on his album What a Wonderful World (peaked at No. 73 on the Billboard Hot Country Singles chart)
 1992: Nick Cave and Shane MacGowan, the lead single and title track to their split album What a Wonderful World (reached number 72 on the UK charts)
 1993: Israel Kamakawiwo'ole, Hawaiian ukulele version (medley with "Somewhere Over the Rainbow") on the album Facing Future (sold over 2.5 million copies in the U.S. and Canada alone)
 1999: Anne Murray, on What a Wonderful World which also spawned a book and video (the album reached No. 1 on the US CCM chart, No. 4 on the US Country chart, No. 38 on the top 200, and No. 15 on the Canadian Country charts)
 1999: Alison Moyet, included on the CD and cassette singles of Boyzone's cover version of When the Going Gets Tough, the Tough Get Going which was released for Comic Relief that year and her version of What A Wonderful World also featured in adverts for Red Noses being sold at Sainsbury's in the run-up to Red Nose Day that year 
 2002: Joey Ramone's debut posthumous album Don't Worry About Me included a cover of the song as its only single. The cover was used for the ending credits of Michael Moore's film Bowling for Columbine. It also appeared on the soundtrack to Freaky Friday.
 2004: Rod Stewart recorded a version of the song with Stevie Wonder for Stewart's album Stardust: The Great American Songbook, Volume III (released in the United States as the lead single from the album and by early 2005 reached No. 13 on the Billboard Adult Contemporary chart).
 2006: Beatbox vs. DJ Miko released a Eurotrance cover of this song, which was featured in the arcade and Japanese PS2 game Dance Dance Revolution SuperNova, as well as two subsequent arcade releases.
 2011: Bob Thiele Jr. did a cover of the song which was performed by Alison Mosshart and The Forest Rangers for the FX series Sons of Anarchy (SE4E1 Out) and was included in Songs of Anarchy: Music from Sons of Anarchy Seasons 1-4 album.
 2012: Pat Byrne's version reached No. 3 in the Irish Singles Chart after appearing on The Voice of Ireland.
 2018: Barbra Streisand blended the song with Lennon's "Imagine" for her album Walls.
 2019: Reuben and the Dark contributed a cover of the song for the soundtrack of the 2020 film Dolittle.
 2021: Norm Lewis and Nicolas King recorded the song as a duet for King's album “Act One”.
 2021: The song was featured and performed as the finale segment of closing ceremony at 2020 Summer Paralympics in Tokyo.

References in other works
 1995: Half Man Half Biscuit reference the song in their track "Even Men with Steel Hearts" from the album Some Call It Godcore.

References

External links
 How political is What A Wonderful World? – BBC News article about history and meaning of song

1967 songs
1960s ballads
1967 singles
1968 singles
1988 singles
2000 singles
2007 singles
ABC Records singles
Anne Murray songs
Eva Cassidy songs
Female vocal duets
His Master's Voice singles
Katie Melua songs
Louis Armstrong songs
Number-one singles in Australia
Number-one singles in Scotland
Pop ballads
Roy Clark songs
Song recordings produced by Mike Batt
Songs written by George David Weiss
UK Singles Chart number-one singles